"They Don't Know" is a song composed and first recorded in 1979 by Kirsty MacColl. Though unsuccessful, the song was later recorded by Tracey Ullman in 1983. Ullman's version reached No. 2 in the UK and the No. 8 in the US.

Original version

Composition and release

Recorded in Stiff Records' mobile studio, The China Shop, in the spring of 1979, Kirsty MacColl's original recording of "They Don't Know" "emphasized layered harmonies in which MacColl turns her own voice into a chorus of over-dubbed parts" - an evocation of a long-standing admiration for the Beach Boys engendered at age 7 by hearing her brother's copy of the  "Good Vibrations" single:
 Besides the regular vinyl single release of 1 June 1979 a picture disc edition was issued 6 July 1979. The B-side to "They Don't Know" was MacColl's recording of her composition "Turn My Motor On" - some copies read "Motor On" - , a setlist staple of Drug Addix, the band MacColl had recently left (consideration had been given to making "Turn My Motor On" the A-side).

MacColl's "They Don't Know" reached number two on the Music Week airplay chart without generating sufficient sales to reach the UK Singles Chart - a shortfall blamed on a strike at the distributors for Stiff Records keeping the single out of stores, although its producer Liam Sternberg attributes the failure of "They Don't Know" to ill feeling which developed between MacColl and Stiff Records president Dave Robinson:  Promo copies of a followup single: "You Caught Me Out", were pressed in October 1979 but Stiff opted to shelve the single, with MacColl's first release subsequent to "They Don't Know" being her remake of "Keep Your Hands Off My Baby" released in 1981 on Polydor.

MacColl's version of "They Don't Know" would not make its album debut until 1995 on the singer's retrospective album Galore.

Track listing
 They Don't Know (K. MacColl)
 [Turn My] Motor On (K. MacColl)

Tracey Ullman version

Background

In October 1983, Tracey Ullman reached number two on the UK Singles Chart with her recording of "They Don't Know" for Stiff Records; the track would be included on Ullman's debut album You Broke My Heart in 17 Places.

Well known in the UK as an actress/comedienne, Ullman had had a surprise Top Ten hit with her debut single Breakaway; Pete Waterman, whose Loose End Productions had recently provided Stiff hit singles with the Belle Stars, suggested to his friend Kirsty MacColl that she pitch her composition "They Don't Know" for Ullman to record as her second single.

The production of Ullman's "They Don't Know" was credited to Peter Collins, Waterman's Loose Ends partner. Waterman himself would hone the track, including having MacColl and Rosemary Robinson (the wife of Stiff Records president Dave Robinson) "add Shangri-La-type backing vocals", in Waterman's words, and having MacColl reprise her original "bay-ay-be-ee” to intro the third verse (as Ullman had a limited high-end range).

Held off from the number one position on the UK Singles Charts dated the 15th and 22 October 1983 by "Karma Chameleon" by Culture Club - the eventual number-one single for the year, then in the fourth and fifth week of its six-week number one tenure - "They Don't Know" would be ranked at number 23 on the year-end tally of UK chart singles, and would afford Ullman a number-one hit in Ireland for two weeks, also spending nine weeks at number one in Norway.

MTV-cofounder Robert Pittman saw the video made to promote Ullman's "They Don't Know" and, despite Ullman having nil exposure in the US, Pittman invited her to be a guest MTV VJ for the week of February 13–18, 1984. The resultant positive response caused MCA Records to rush-release "They Don't Know" as Ullman's debut US single, which eventually reached number eight on the Billboard Hot 100 and number 11 on the Adult Contemporary.

"They Don't Know" was Ullman's only Top 40 hit in the US. Although she had three more entries in the UK Top 30 - including the top-ten hit "Move Over Darling" - Ullman, when asked in a 2017 Guardian interview, "If you could edit your past, what would you change?", would go on to say: "I would have stopped making records after 'They Don’t Know'."

In 1997, "They Don't Know" became the theme song for the final three seasons of Ullman's HBO television series Tracey Takes On....  The Ullman version was also used as the theme for the opening credits of Our Nixon, a 2013 documentary about U.S. President Richard Nixon.

Ullman sang the song in 2002 at a memorial tribute concert for MacColl, who was killed in a boating accident in December 2000. It was her first public singing performance in nearly 20 years.

Comparison with Kirsty MacColl's original version
In September 2021, Tracey Ullman confirmed on the BBC's Desert Island Discs radio program that her version of "They Don't Know" contains the high note on the word "Baby" from Kirsty MacColl's original version. Ullman also used a previously-existing MacColl backing track when recording her own version of MacColl's "Terry" in 1984. (Both versions of "Terry" were co-produced by MacColl.)

Video
A video was filmed to promote Ullman's version of "They Don't Know" in which Paul McCartney made a cameo appearance (McCartney had just completed filming Give My Regards to Broad Street in which Ullman had a cameo role). Directed by Stiff Records president Dave Robinson, the video for "They Don't Know" had a storyline devised by Ullman herself in which she played a young woman in a blossoming romantic relationship with her working class, ne'er do well boyfriend in the 1960s. The video concludes with Ullman portraying the song's protagonist as a dowdy council estate type mother (not unlike her character "Betty Tomlinson" from the comedy sketch show Three of a Kind), unkempt, heavily pregnant and shopping for groceries in her slippers, her life of domestic drudgery sustained only by her fantasy of being in a relationship with her idol, Paul McCartney. 

The comical video was voted the second best video of 1983 by readers of Smash Hits magazine (beaten only by Duran Duran's "Union of the Snake" video), while Ullman was voted Best Female Singer, and the song itself was voted 4th Best Single of 1983.

Charts and certifications

Weekly charts

Year-end charts

Certifications

Other cover versions

 Leslie Carter recorded a version for her 2001 cancelled album, Like Wow!.
 In 2006, Katrina Leskanich recorded an acoustic version of the song for her self-titled album: (Leskanich quote:) "I kept saying to [her mid-1980s bandmates in Katrina & the Waves]: 'Let's do a [stripped-down] version of "They Don't Know"...There's another song in there that Tracey Ullman and [even its writer] Kirsty MacColl...didn't touch. It could be really, really tender.' When the Waves split up, I thought: 'Good, now I can do it!'" A dance-pop remix of the track was issued in 2008. 
 In 2011, after performing the song live in concert, Kim Wilde recorded a studio version for her album of cover songs Snapshots.
 In 2011, Andrea Corr included a cover on her solo album Lifelines.
 In 2013, Matthew Sweet and Susanna Hoffs covered the song for their album Under the Covers, Vol. 3.
 In 2014, country singer Lydia Loveless recorded a version for her album Somewhere Else released by Bloodshot Records.

References

Kirsty MacColl songs
Tracey Ullman songs
1979 debut singles
1983 singles
1984 singles
Irish Singles Chart number-one singles
Number-one singles in Norway
Songs written by Kirsty MacColl
Stiff Records singles
1979 songs